Amanda Falck Weber  (born 1996) is a Danish orienteering competitor. She was born in Frederiksværk-Hundested, and resides in Aarhus. She competed at the 2018 World Orienteering Championships in Latvia, where she won a bronze medal in the mixed sprint relay, together with Tue Lassen, Jakob Edsen and Maja Alm.

She competed in the Orienteering World Cup in 2017 and 2018, and represented Denmark in the 2018 European Orienteering Championships.

References

External links
 

Danish orienteers
Female orienteers
Foot orienteers
1996 births
Living people
People from Halsnæs Municipality
People from Aarhus
Sportspeople from the Capital Region of Denmark